Vikramaditya is a 1945 Hindi historical drama film directed by Vijay Bhatt for his banner Prakash Pictures. The title role of the King of Avanti, Vikramaditya, was played by Prithviraj Kapoor, who had made a name for himself as a good actor by then and was extremely popular. The film-maker concentrated on factual history rather than fiction for his story. The music direction was by Shankar Rao Vyas with the lyricists being Ramesh Gupta and Roopdas. The film starred Prithviraj Kapoor, Prem Adib, Baburao Pendharkar, Ratnamala, Bhagwandas and Ranjana.

The story revolves around the king Vikramaditya, who promises to save the princess of Kashmir, appoints Kalidas as court-poet, and his fight against the Shakas (Scythians).

Plot
The Shakas (Scythians) have invaded and defeated the Kashmir region. The Kashmiri princess Shreelakha, is on the run to avoid captivity and unwanted attention of Shakraj. The Shakas have already managed to capture several areas in India and the princess is finding it difficult to find refuge. She meets Kalidas the poet, who tells her to ask for shelter from King Vikramaditya, the ruler of Avanti. Kalidas, through his poetry impresses Madhvi, the daughter of Acharya Varamihir and she makes it possible for them to meet Vikramaditya. The King appoints Kalidas as the court poet. The princess asks for refuge and war against the Shakas. When Vikramaditya promises to do so he is met with opposition from his Minister, Vaital. Vaital on being rebuffed by the King then incites the people against the princess and tries to poison her. After several incidents involving the honesty of the King and his travails, the people think that Vaital has poisoned the King and the princess. The magnanimity and valour of the King is shown when he fights the Shakas, killing Shakaraj and releasing Shreelekha's father from captivity and restoring his kingdom.

Cast
 Prithviraj Kapoor
 Ratnamala
 Baburao Pendharkar
 Prem Adib
 Ranjana
 Bhagwandas
 Jilloobai

Soundtrack
Music Director was Shankar Rao Vyas and the lyricists were Ramesh Gupta and Roopdas. The singers were Rajkumari, Amirbai Karnataki, G. M. Durrani, Manna Dey.

Song list

References

External links

1945 films
1940s Hindi-language films
Indian biographical drama films
Indian epic films
Biographical films about royalty
Films directed by Vijay Bhatt
Memorials to Vikramaditya
Indian historical drama films
History of India on film
1940s biographical drama films
1940s historical drama films
Indian black-and-white films